The geology of Hong Kong is dominated by igneous rocks (including granitic rocks and volcanic rocks) formed during a major volcanic eruption period in the Mesozoic era. It made up 85% of Hong Kong's land surface and the remaining 15% are mostly sedimentary rocks located in the northeast New Territories. There are also a very small percentage (less than 1%) of metamorphic rocks in the New Territories, formed by deformation of pre-existing sedimentary rocks (metamorphism).

The geological history of Hong Kong started as early as the Devonian period (~420 million years ago) which is marked by the discovery of Placoderm (a Devonian fish) fossils in northeast Hong Kong. While the youngest rocks in Hong Kong are formed during the Paleogene period(~50 million years old). They are today exposed in Tung Ping Chau in northeast Hong Kong.

Each of the three types of rocks: igneous, sedimentary, and metamorphic rocks formed spectacular geological features in Hong Kong. Igneous rocks formed the hexagonal columns in Sai Kung. Sedimentary rocks formed various erosion features such as wave-cut platforms and sea stacks in Tung Ping Chau. Metamorphic rocks formed the iron ore deposits in Ma On Shan. Each of these will be introduced in later sections.

In terms of structural geology, faults in Hong Kong are mainly running from the northeast to the southwest. Deformation features such as sheared rocks, folds and faulted rocks can be found near major faults such as are the banks of the Tolo Channel. Past fault activities can be traced by some structures such as the Lantau dyke swarm and deformed caldera, etc. Faulting have shaped the landscape of Hong Kong. (See more on "Faulting" section)

Geological Evolution 
The geological history of Hong Kong is mainly divided into three periods. From the Devonian to the early Jurassic is the pre-volcanic sedimentary period. Environment of Hong Kong alternated between a river plain and a shallow sea setting. Rocks of this period are characterized by a variety of fossils, heavily folded strata and steeply tilted beds. Later, from the middle Jurassic to the early Cretaceous period, Hong Kong experienced a volcanic period. It is marked by the massive coverage of volcanic lava, ash, and granitic rocks. From the middle Cretaceous onward, it is the post-volcanic sedimentary period. It is represented by reddish colored sedimentary rocks which as an indication of an arid tropical climate during deposition.

Major rock units in Hong Kong are shown by chronological order in the table below.

Igneous rocks 
The geology of Hong Kong is dominated by igneous rocks. They are rocks related to volcanic eruptions. During the middle Jurassic to the early Cretaceous period, Hong Kong was right at the convergent plate boundary where the Paleo-Pacific oceanic plate subducted beneath the Eurasian continental plate. The oceanic plate carried sea water into the hot lower crust, which lowered the melting point of the crust. The crust was therefore partially melted and magma was formed. The magma rose and formed a magma chamber beneath surface. Volcanoes were therefore formed above the magma chamber. When erupted, volcanic ash, pieces of rocks, and some magma were expelled. These materials then eventually cooled down and became volcanic rocks. These rocks cooled down quickly once they reached the Earth's surface. Mineral crystals in these rocks are therefore very small.

Volcanic rocks are widely distributed in Hong Kong (green areas in Fig.1). They formed most of the highest mountains in Hong Kong, such as Tai Mo Shan (957 m, the highest mountain) and Lantau Peak (934 m, the second highest mountain). In the eastern part of Hong Kong, these volcanic rocks form hexagonal columnar cooling joints. They can be seen from the High Island reservoir and islands nearby. These areas are listed as part of the UNESCO Global Geopark of Hong Kong.

In the early Cretaceous period (about 140 million years ago), volcanic activities ceased. The hot magma in the magma chamber eventually cooled down and became granitic rocks. These magma cooled slowly below the ground surface. Mineral crystals are therefore large enough to be seen.

Granitic rocks cover about 35% of Hong Kong's land surface (red area in fig.1). They are mainly distributed in Kowloon, north Hong Kong Island, east Lantau, and Tuen Mun. Granitic rocks formed the Victoria Harbour where Hong Kong is given its name as the "scentful harbour".

Sai Kung hexagonal columnar cooling joints 

Hexagonal columnar joints are parallel vertical cracks that are formed when homogeneous volcanic materials cool down and evenly contract inward towards a contraction center point. In the early Cretaceous period, there was a volcano centred east of the Sai Kung peninsula. The final eruption of the volcano was explosive and the magma chamber was emptied. It lost support in its core and collapsed. The remains became a caldera with a diameter of about 20 km. The large amount of volcanic ash produced in this eruption eventually settled in the caldera and formed a thick layer of hot viscous ash. The hot ash eventually cooled down. Then each column started to contract inwards. When each side of the hexagon shrinks evenly towards the centre, it formed regular hexagonal shaped cracks. Starting from the top part, the cracks developed downwards. Finally the pillars were created.

The total number of hexagonal columns in Hong Kong is estimated to be 200,000, covering 100 square kilometers. Diameters of the columns ranges from 1 to 3 meters where most of the columns are tilted and are dipping towards the northwest at about 80 degrees. Some columns, such as those on the east dam of High Island Reservoir, are curved by tectonic force, showing the ductile nature of the columns

The hexagonal columns in Hong Kong are light brown in colour because of the rock's silica-rich chemistry. It contains about 76% silica. Compared with columns in the rest of the world which are mostly basaltic or andesitic (low silica), such a large group of well-preserved silica-rich hexagonal columns is very rare. The hexagonal columns are therefore the most important feature of the UNESCO Global Geopark of Hong Kong.

IUGS geological heritage site
In respect of it being 'one of the most spectacular rhyolitic columnar rock formations in the world', the International Union of Geological Sciences (IUGS) included the 'Early Cretaceous rhyolitic columnar rock formation of Hong Kong' in its assemblage of 100 'geological heritage sites' around the world in a listing published in October 2022. The organisation defines an IUGS Geological Heritage Site as 'a key place with geological elements and/or processes of international scientific relevance, used as a reference, and/or with a substantial contribution to the development of geological sciences through history.'

Lion Rock and Kowloon granite 

Lion rock is located on the north of Kowloon Peninsula. Its appearance resembles a laid down lion which is often used as a city symbol and landmark. of Hong Kong. The Lion Rock is part of the Kowloon granite that covers Kowloon, Victoria Harbour and northern Hong Kong Island. The middle part of the Kowloon granite was subjected to heavier weathering, forming the Victoria Harbour, where Hong Kong started its development. To the north of Kowloon, granite formed the Lion Rock, and hills lining up along the northern boundary of Kowloon. Most of the buildings on the two sides of Victoria Harbour are sitting on the Kowloon granite.

The Kowloon granite exhibits a circular shape surrounding Victoria Harbour, and is surrounded by volcanic rocks. The volcanic rocks are oriented in a way such that they are surrounding the circular Kowloon granite. During early Cretaceous period, a ball shaped magma rose. It pushed and deformed the surrounding volcanic rocks outwards and formed the interesting orientations of its surrounding volcanic rocks.

Sedimentary rock 
The sedimentary rock that makes up around 15% of Hong Kong land surface formed by deposition of alluvial sediments, such as sand, mud, the exoskeletons of marine plankton, and pebbles. As sediments were continually deposited, the older layers were compressed by the weight of overlying younger layers into sedimentary rock. Since sediments always deposit in horizontal layers, any observable deformations, such as folds, record tectonic activities. 

Fossils are often better preserved in sedimentary rocks. In Hong Kong, the oldest, dateable sedimentary rocks come from the Devonian period (~416 Mya), containing Placoderm (a Devonian fish) fossils, discovered in Bluff Head formation in northeast New Territories. The youngest sedimentary formations date to the Paleogene (~50 Mya) in Tung Ping Chau in northeast Hong Kong.

Tung Ping Chau erosion features 
Tung Ping Chau, 'eastern flat island' in Cantonese, is a crescent-shaped island in northeast Hong Kong. Its 'flatness' is derived from the relatively undeformed layers of its sedimentary formation. The island is famous for its spectacular erosional features, such as sea stacks and wave-cut platforms. Lung Lok Shui, which means 'dragon diving into water,' is a well-known geological formation that looks like a dragon's back descending into the sea. The structure's most prominent feature, the grey layer of chert, which is more resistant to erosion than the surrounding sandstone, is said to resemble a dragon's spine.

Rocks on Tung Ping Chau are fine-grained and reddish-brown from increased iron oxidation during the hot and humid Paleogene period and weak, shallow currents depositing fine sediments. Fossils of terrestrial plants and evaporites in rocks on Tung Ping Chau indicate that it may have been a saline lake during the Paleogene.

Ma Shi Chau 
Ma Shi Chau is a tidal island in the Tolo Harbour in northeast New Territories. It is an important special area for geological studies. It contains rocks from three different formations: Permian sedimentary rocks, Early Cretaceous volcanic rocks and middle Cretaceous sedimentary rocks. Fossils of ammonoids, corals and bivalves were found in the black Permian sedimentary rocks. Layers of fine volcanic ash deposits formed the light grey colored tuffaceous layers interbedded with the brownish Cretaceous sediments. Ma Shi Chau is very close to a major fault (Tolo channel fault). Rocks on Ma Shi Chau are therefore subjected to deformation by fault activities. Various deformed structures such as folds, kink bands, microfaults and sheared rocks can be observed on Ma Shi Chau.

Metamorphic rocks 
Metamorphic rocks made up less than 1% of Hong Kong land surface. They are found in Lok Ma Chau near the border with Shenzhen, Ma On Shan and Yuen Long. However, metamorphic rocks in Ma On Shan and Yuen Long were only seen in boreholes. Metamorphic rocks are sedimentary rocks or igneous rocks that are altered under high temperature and pressure but are not melted. Atoms are re-arranged and new minerals are formed. Metamorphic rocks in Hong Kong are all altered sedimentary rocks formed in Carboniferous period. Then until the middle Jurassic volcanic activity, magma chambers were formed and they intruded into older rocks. The heat of the magma together with active movements along major faults in Hong Kong, created a high temperature and pressure environment, causing the relatively older Carboniferous sedimentary layers to alter. Rocks in Lok Ma Chau became meta-sedimentary rocks and phyllites, which were low-grade metamorphic rocks. This indicates that Lok Ma Chau rocks were not much altered. However, rocks in Ma On Shan and Yuen Long, which were originally limestones, became a high-grade marble. These rocks were significantly altered by the high temperature of magma intrusions.

Ma On Shan Iron ore 
Iron ore ore bodies were found in Ma On Shan. They are both located near a granitic body, where hot magma intrusions existed during late Jurassic. The hot magma carried metal ores to the crust from the mantle as it rose. Metal ores are concentrated into hot fluids as it forced itself into cracks of the Ma On Shan limestone. The hot concentrated fluid (hydrothermal fluid) triggered chemical reactions. This process finally produced skarn, which an altered rock that carried the concentrated metal ores.

Mining in Ma On Shan first started in 1906 and became very active during the second World War for weapon production. Later, in 1976, the mine was closed down due to dropping metal prices. Today, the mining tunnels and the mining pit can still be seen in Ma On Shan.

Faulting  

The main faults in Hong Kong are oriented northeast–southwest, and northwest–southeast (see fig.1). They are generally of the same orientation as those in neighboring Guangdong Province. They are part of the Lianhuashan fault zone that contains faults of similar orientations extended along the southeast China coast to Shanghai.

Although faults are recorded throughout the known geological history of Hong Kong, they are considered to have been most active during the Jurassic to Cretaceous periods when strike-slip and thrust faulting was dominant. Some faults represent structures that were active during the period of Late Jurassic to Early Cretaceous volcanic activity and facilitated the rise of magma to the surface. Faults in Hong Kong formed interesting features that can be traced to understand their activities.

Lantau dyke swarm 
The Lantau dyke swarm is located on east Lantau Island. It is a group of vertical sheets of rocks formed by magma and lava flowing into northeast trending cracks in pre-existing granitic rocks on Lantau Island. Those cracks were related to the northeast trending faults. The Lantau caldera, which was the volcanic centre of the magma, is also bounded by faults and exhibits an elongated shape towards the northeast. These structures recorded the active strike-slip motion of the northeast trending faults in Lantau Island during Late Jurassic. (~148 million years ago).

Tolo Channel Fault system 
The Tolo Channel fault system is the longest fault system in Hong Kong running from Tolo Channel in the northeast, cutting through Shing Mun river in Sha Tin and extending to southeast Lantau Island. It is approximately 60-km long. Traces of displacements and shearing are well-preserved in rock units on the both side of the Tolo Channel. Examples are kink bands, microfaults, veins at Ma Chi Chau on the north coast and en echelon veins, drag folds, and sigma structures at Nai Chung on the south coast. These structure are all found in the middle Jurassic Tolo Channel formation sedimentary rocks and are traces of shearing events. They represent the most active period of the Tolo Channel fault systems during the middle Jurassic volcanic activities.

See also
Hong Kong Global Geopark
Mining in Hong Kong
1972 Hong Kong landslide

References

External links

Online Hong Kong Geological Survey Memoir
The Geological Society of Hong Kong - 香港地質學會
Geological overview of Hong Kong

 
First 100 IUGS Geological Heritage Sites